is a racing game developed and published by Capcom, first released on PlayStation 2, later ported to GameCube and Xbox.

Description
Auto Modellista marked itself apart from others of the same genre with cel-shaded graphics, which gave a hand-drawn and cartoon-like appearance. The game is similar in gameplay to games like Gran Turismo, with the player picking a vehicle which they can modify and customize. There are six tracks in the default game, including the real-life Suzuka Circuit and the Mt. Akagi mountain pass.

After poor initial reception, Capcom modified the game for its North American releases. In Japan, the game was rereleased with these changes as Auto Modellista: US Tuned. This version featured American cars such as the Dodge Viper, two new oval tracks, various UI improvements and a new handling model that saw cars accelerate slower and lose more speed in turns.

The US Tuned changes were present in every single release of the game starting with the North American PS2 release in early 2003, evidenced by the new cover art with the Dodge Viper. Many distributors predicted that sales of the game were going to be poor, and generally refused to carry it.

Also in 2003, Auto Modellista received a followup in the form of Group S Challenge for the Xbox, though it lacked any of Auto Modellista'''s visual style and is generally not considered to be a direct sequel. Capcom has not been involved with driving games since, although it did publish some games based on MotoGP developed by Milestone srl, and included Mega Man Battle & Chase, a racing game based on the Mega Man franchise, in the Mega Man X Collection.

GameplayAuto Modellista attempts to be a very technical racing game, with an immense amount of available parts and settings for the selection of cars provided to the player. Various aspects of each car can be tuned, allowing the player to tweak the performance of the car.

In the Garage mode (the main single-player mode), the player is granted the ability to select one of four tire types which affect road grip in regard to the weather conditions on the race track (for example, the "Semi-Slick Tires" provide maximum speed and grip in dry weather, but suffer in rain). Other options include brakes (which determine braking efficiency), suspension, Turbines, Mufflers, Computer (determines the car's ability to accept upgrades later in the game), the engine, "Final Gear", and Weight Reduction.

Auto Modellista's customisation options also extends to visual enhancements, allowing the player to choose from many different color combinations, hood and spoiler types, plus the ability to add badges, stickers and even create license plates. Engine swaps are also available, for example, the Subaru 360 can have EJ20T in place of its EK32. Swapped engines cannot be retuned in the game.

A large aspect of the game was its online mode, with online races supporting up to 8 players. This functionality was not available on the GameCube and European PlayStation 2 versions. The online mode of Auto Modellista has since been terminated, and cannot be used in any versions of the game.

DevelopmentAuto Modellista was a part of an initiative from Capcom's Production Studio 1 to develop three network focused games on the PlayStation 2. The other games were Monster Hunter and Resident Evil Outbreak. Capcom's plan was that at least one of the games would become a million seller. Both Monster Hunter and Resident Evil Outbreak eventually became million sellers.

Reception

The game received "mixed or average reviews" on all platforms according to video game review aggregator Metacritic. In Japan, Famitsu'' gave the PS2 version a score of 30 out of 40.

References

External links
CAPCOM - auto modellista (official site)
CAPCOM - auto modellista (Japanese official site)

Racing video games
PlayStation 2 games
GameCube games
Xbox games
2002 video games
Video games developed in Japan
Video games with cel-shaded animation
Video games scored by Tetsuya Shibata
Video games set in Tokyo
Capcom games
Multiplayer and single-player video games